Joseph S. Noris (born October 26, 1951) is an American former professional ice hockey center. He played in the National Hockey League between 1971 and 1974, and the World Hockey Association between 1975 and 1978. Internationally he played for the American national team at the 1976 Canada Cup.

Playing career
Drafted in the third round, 32nd overall, by the Pittsburgh Penguins in the 1971 NHL Amateur Draft, Noris played 55 regular season games in the National Hockey League with the Penguins, St. Louis Blues, and Buffalo Sabres in 1971–74. He also played in the World Hockey Association with the San Diego Mariners and the Birmingham Bulls, skating in 198 WHA games, scoring 72 goals and adding 116 assists from 1975–1978.

Noris was selected to the 1977 WHA All-Star Game as the Mariners representative and also played for the United States at the inaugural 1976 Canada Cup tournament.

Noris was the first player who grew up in Colorado to make it to the NHL. He would be the only Colorado native to suit up until Parris Duffus played a single game in 1997.

Personal life
Noris currently owns and runs Skate San Diego, a roller hockey rink in Santee, California.

Career statistics

Regular season and playoffs

International

References

External links
 
 Joe Noris @ hockeydraftcentral

1951 births
Living people
American men's ice hockey centers
ATSE Graz players
Birmingham Bulls players
Buffalo Sabres players
Cincinnati Swords players
Hershey Bears players
Ice hockey people from Denver
Kitchener Rangers players
People from Santee, California
Pittsburgh Penguins draft picks
Pittsburgh Penguins players
San Diego Mariners players
San Diego Mariners (PHL) players
St. Louis Blues players
Syracuse Eagles players
Toronto Marlboros players